The Kenkeme (Keŋkeme) is a river in Yakutia (Sakha Republic), Russia.

The Mirny — Yakutsk stretch of the A331 highway has a bridge over the Kenkeme. The river flows across a desolate region. The only inhabited place in its basin is an Evenk settlement in the middle course. Since it is not far from Yakutsk, the Kenkeme is a popular summer destination for kayaking and rafting.

Course  
The Kenkeme originates in the northeastern edge of the Lena Plateau, at the confluence of the Yagas-Yyaabyt (Ыагас-Ыйаабыт) and Yolyong-Yurege (Ёлёнг-Юрэгэ) rivers. It heads first in a southeastern direction, bending to the east and then to the north, forming meanders in the floodplain and flowing across the Central Yakutian Lowland parallel to the Khanchaly to the west and the Lena to the east. Finally it joins the left bank of the Lena  from its mouth, shortly after the great river makes a big bend to the west; east of the mouth of the Aldan and nearly opposite of the mouth of the Belyanka in the facing bank. 

The Kenkeme has a large river basin which includes parts of the Gorny District, Khangalassky District, Yakutsk Urban District, Namsky District and Kobyaysky District.

The river is fed by snow and rain. Between November and May it freezes to the bottom.

Flora and fauna
The vegetation of the river basin consists of lightly spread coniferous forests, where the main tree species is larch. There is continuous permafrost in the region.

Ide, dace, pike, roach and grayling are the main fish species found in the waters of the Kenkeme.

See also
List of rivers of Russia

References

External links 

Fishing & Tourism in Yakutia

Rivers of the Sakha Republic
Central Yakutian Lowland